The 1980 New Orleans Saints season was the team's 14th as a member of the National Football League (NFL). The Saints failed to improve on the previous season's record of 8–8, instead winning only one game. The team missed the playoffs for the fourteenth consecutive season and had the dubious distinction not only of winning only a single game, but winning it by a single point against the New York Jets, who like the Saints had widely been predicted before the season to advance to the playoffs, but struggled instead. The main culprit of the Saints' collapse was the defense, which ranked last in yards and points (487) allowed.

The team's only bright spot was tenth-year quarterback Archie Manning, who proceeded to have the best year of his career, throwing for 3,716 yards, 23 touchdowns and 20 interceptions.

Season summary
Disgruntled fans called their team “the Aints”, going so far as to show up to games wearing brown paper bags over their heads after their team was 0–12 and playing the Los Angeles Rams, to whom they lost 27–7 on Monday Night Football. In embarrassment, they called themselves the Unknown Fan (a spinoff from The Unknown Comic) in a practice that would become the trademark of disgruntled fans across various sports in the United States. Coach Dick Nolan was fired after this game, and replaced by Dick Stanfel. In Week 14, playing the San Francisco 49ers in Candlestick Park, the Saints charged out to a 35–7 lead at halftime, led by three touchdown passes from Archie Manning and a pair of one-yard touchdown runs from Jack Holmes. However, the 49ers rallied behind quarterback Joe Montana, who rushed for a touchdown and passed for two more. The 49ers tied the game 35–35 on a fourth-quarter touchdown run by Lenvil Elliott and went on to win in overtime, 38–35, on a Ray Wersching field goal. The 28-point comeback by the 49ers was, at the time, the largest comeback in NFL history, and was the largest comeback in regular season history until it was eclipsed in 2022 by the Minnesota Vikings, who rallied from a 33-0 halftime deficit vs. the Indianapolis Colts to win 39-36 in overtime.

The 2013 Houston Texans matched the 14 game losing streak of both the 1980 Saints and the 1976 Buccaneers after starting 2–0.

The 1980 Saints were the first team to end the season at 1–15.

The 1989 Dallas Cowboys, 1990 New England Patriots, 1991 Indianapolis Colts, 1996 New York Jets, 2000 San Diego Chargers, 2001 Carolina Panthers, 2007 Miami Dolphins, 2009 St. Louis Rams, 2016 Cleveland Browns, and 2020 Jacksonville Jaguars later matched the 1980 Saints by finishing 1–15, but the 2008 Detroit Lions and 2017 Cleveland Browns both exceeded it by finishing with an 0–16 record. The 1991 Colts (vs. Jets) and 2000 Chargers (vs. Chiefs) also won their lone games by a single point.

Offseason

NFL draft

Personnel

Staff

Roster

Schedule

Note: Intra-division opponents are in bold text.

Game summaries

Week 3 vs Bills

Week 15

Standings

References

New Orleans Saints seasons
New Orleans
New